Michael A. Guido (July 3, 1954December 5, 2006) was an American politician who served as the 5th mayor of Dearborn, Michigan from 1986 until his death in 2006. He also was appointed to serve as the 64th President of the United States Conference of Mayors for the 2006 to 2007 term, but due to his death John B. O'Reilly, Jr. finished Guido's term.

Career

Dearborn City Council

Guido's political career started in 1978 when he was elected to the Dearborn city council as a Republican. At the age of 23 he was the youngest ever person elected to the city council. He was re-elected to a second term, and resigned from the council following his election as mayor in 1986.

Mayor of Dearborn

Michael Guido was elected the 5th, and youngest, mayor of Dearborn in 1986 in a close and contentious election against Democrat president of the city council Marge Powell. He ran for re-election 6 times, winning all of them and even ran unopposed for twice. His last election was in 2005. As mayor Guido is best known for his early clashes with the community leaders of the city's growing Arab American population, with almost all the challengers in his mayoral campaigns being Arab-Americans. However, following  the September 11 attacks, Guido reconciled with his longtime adversaries stating that "We Stand United Against Terror". His crowning achievement as mayor was redevelopment, part of which included building the Ford Community & Performing Arts Center, the largest municipally owned Performing Arts Center in the nation. He also was known for his jovial and outgoing nature, earning him the nickname "mayor friendly."

United States Conference of Mayors

Guido was selected to serve as the 64th President of the United States Conference of Mayors for its 2006 to 2007 term. He embarked on a goodwill tour to numerous cities in the conference. However, his tenure was cut short due to his cancer diagnoses.

Death

After serving as mayor for 21 years, Guido was diagnosed with cancer, and he eventually succumbed to the disease during his 7th term on December 5, 2006. Following his death John D. Dingell extended condolences to his family on behalf of Congress.

Personal life

Michael Guido was the child of Italian immigrants and a lifelong Roman Catholic. He was married to Kari Guido, and had two sons Michael and Anthony.

References

Living people
Michigan Republicans
Mayors of places in Michigan
Adler University alumni
1954 births
20th-century American politicians
21st-century American politicians